Paweł Socha may refer to:
 Paweł Socha (bishop), Polish Roman Catholic bishop
 Paweł Socha (footballer), Polish football player